Family Express is a privately-held United States convenience store chain headquartered in Valparaiso, Indiana, with more than 70 locations across northern and central Indiana.

Family Express is known for its pursuit of vertical integration, following an approach similar to Kwik Trip. The Family Express logistics model consolidates what would otherwise be 25 direct store deliveries by different vendors to each store weekly into one combined daily delivery by Family Express itself. One result of the company's centralized logistics, according to the company, has been increased freshness.
 
The company's use of a centralized commissary has been a core aspect of its approach to logistics.  In 2004, the company announced plans for its first centralized commissary and bakery at a former warehouse site in Valparaiso.  The commissary opened in late 2006. Prior to the launch of the company's commissary, the bakery products were shipped from a manufacturer in Chicago and cross docked for delivery to stores. In 2010, the company built a new  distribution center, which includes a bakery.  

The company has attracted attention for its use of its own proprietary branding, including the Cravin's Market brand for bakery items, Java Wave for hot beverages, and square donuts. Branding has extended to the company's delivery trucks as well, which are festooned with upside-down cows and emit a "moo" sound when arriving and leaving each location.  In 2016, the company launched a "hot foodservice" brand called Cravin's Kitchen at some locations. Offering kiosk, mobile and app-based ordering, the brand included breakfast sandwiches and "made-to-order" pizzas.

Family Express has placed a high emphasis on attracting and retaining "high-quality employees".
The Family Express turnover rate is among the lowest in the convenience store industry. According to CEO Gus Olympidis, the company uses "personal and institutional behavior and performance tools" and selects only one candidate out of fifty.  In 2011, Olympidis announced that half of the company's stores had zero turnover the previous year. As of 2018, the company's starting wage was US$11 per hour.

The company released a customer loyalty app in 2019.  Developed by retail industry software as a service provider Paytronix, the app included online ordering for hot foodservice items as well as more traditional customer engagement features.  According to Paytronix, the Family Express app was the first convenience-store customer loyalty app to include online ordering.

The company's Valparaiso headquarters includes a "full-scale, functioning store" for employee training and product testing.

Origin and expansion 

The company was started by Gus Olympidis with a single location on Valparaiso's west side in 1975.  The initial name of the stores was "Time Low", which changed to "Family Express" in 1987.

Originally a Northwest Indiana company, in 1999 the company purchased Carter Oil, giving it access to the Lafayette market and improved exposure on Interstate 65. It entered the suburban Indianapolis market in 2018.  Plans for the Indianapolis expansion included new sites in Zionsville, Whitestown, and Carmel, with the Carmel location to be designed Art Deco style in conformity with local zoning standards.

Controversies 

From 2006 to 2018, Family Express was involved in a trademark dispute with Square Donuts of Terre Haute over Family Express's use of the phrase "square donuts" to describe its square donuts. Square Donuts sent a cease and desist letter to Family Express in 2006, which Family Express opposed on the ground that referring to a square donut as a "square donut" is purely descriptive. Square Donuts obtained state and federal trademark protection in 2012 and 2013, and the United States Patent and Trademark Office subsequently rejected Family Express's own trademark application due to likelihood of confusion with the Square Donuts mark. 

In 2016, Family Express brought a declaratory judgment action in federal court to have the Square Donuts trademark invalidated on grounds of descriptiveness.  In 2018, Family Express added a new argument, that Square Donuts had abandoned its mark by allowing third parties to use it.  Later in 2018, the parties reached a settlement.

In 2019, after revelations of severe animal abuse at a confined animal feeding operation operated by Fair Oaks Farms, Family Express discontinued all Fairlife products, replacing them with Organic Valley.  Family Express, which was joined by other companies including Jewel-Osco in withdrawing Fairlife products, issued a statement describing the abuse as "chilling".

Recognition 

In 2015, the company received the Convenience Store Decisions "Chain of the Year" award, described as "one of the most prestigious convenience retail awards in the United States."  The award was presented by the CEO of RaceTrac Petroleum, who praised the company's "outstanding operations" and "ongoing commitment to convenience retail". 

In 2019, Delish named Family Express the best local convenience store in Indiana.

In 2019, the National Advisory Group trade association gave Family Express CEO Gus Olympidis its NAG Lifetime Award for Convenience Retailing. The association cited his "indelible mark on the convenience retailing industry".  

As of 2019, trade publication CSP Magazine ranked Family Express 91st in its "Top 202" convenience store listing, up from 99th place the previous year.

References

External links 

 
	 
Valparaiso, Indiana
Privately held companies based in Indiana
American companies established in 1975
Retail companies established in 1975
Energy companies established in 1975
Non-renewable resource companies established in 1975
Convenience stores of the United States
Gas stations in the United States
1975 establishments in Indiana